Andy Warhol Bridge, also known as the Seventh Street Bridge, spans the Allegheny River in Downtown Pittsburgh. It is the only bridge in the United States named for a visual artist.  It was opened at a cost of $1.5 million on June 17, 1926, in a ceremony attended by 2,000.

History and architectural features
Named for the artist Andy Warhol, a Pittsburgh native, this structure is one of three parallel bridges called The Three Sisters, the others being the Roberto Clemente Bridge and the Rachel Carson Bridge. The Three Sisters are self-anchored suspension bridges and are historically significant because they are the only trio of nearly identical bridges — as well as the first self-anchored suspension spans — built in the United States.

The bridge was renamed for Warhol on March 18, 2005, as part of the tenth-anniversary celebration for the Andy Warhol Museum. The museum is nearby at 117 Sandusky Street, a street which leads to the bridge from the north side of the river on Pittsburgh's North Shore.

On August 11, 2013, the Andy Warhol Bridge was covered with 580 knitted and crocheted panels in a yarn bombing project known as Knit the Bridge that lasted for four weeks.

This is the third bridge on the site, the first having been demolished in early 1884. Construction of its replacement began in 1884, opening to traffic in 1887.

Gallery

See also
List of bridges documented by the Historic American Engineering Record in Pennsylvania
List of crossings of the Allegheny River

References 

Pohla Smith (2005). Warhol Bridge Dedication: story by Pittsburgh Post-Gazette. Retrieved April 23, 2006.

External links

 
 Seventh Street Bridge at pghbridges.com
 Andy Warhol (Seventh Street) at BridgeMeister.com

Warhol
Bridges completed in 1926
Self-anchored suspension bridges
Bridges over the Allegheny River
Andy Warhol
Road bridges on the National Register of Historic Places in Pennsylvania
Pittsburgh History & Landmarks Foundation Historic Landmarks
Suspension bridges in Pennsylvania
Historic American Engineering Record in Pennsylvania
1926 establishments in Pennsylvania
National Register of Historic Places in Pittsburgh
Steel bridges in the United States